Pseudocalotes is a genus of agamid lizards endemic to Southeast Asia.

Taxonomy and description
Pseudocalotes was disassociated from the genus Calotes by Scott Michael Moody in 1980. Pseudocalotes is distinguished from Calotes in having weak limbs, as may be noted in one of the species named brevipes. It is distinguished from the C. versicolor group in having mixed orientation of dorsal scales, and lacking spines on the head. It is distinguished from Bronchocela in lacking a cheek skin fold, and in having short weak limbs. Pseudocalotes species do not have any enlarged compressed set of scales behind the orbit.

Geographic range
Pseudocalotes does not occur west of Sumatra and might occur in the Isthmus of Kra and Myanmar. A specimen was reported from N.E. India in the past though never verified.

Species of genus Pseudocalotes
The Indochinese group
Pseudocalotes andamanensis  – Andaman Islands – green crestless forest lizard 
Pseudocalotes bapoensis  – China (Yunnan)
Pseudocalotes brevipes  – northern Vietnam – Vietnam false bloodsucker
Pseudocalotes floweri  – eastern Thailand and Cambodia – Thai false bloodsucker, Flower’s forest agamid
Pseudocalotes kakhienensis  – Kakhyen Hills spiny lizard, Burmese mountain agamid 
Pseudocalotes khaonanensis  – Nakhon Si Thammarat, peninsular Thailand
Pseudocalotes kingdonwardi  – Kingdonward's bloodsucker
Pseudocalotes microlepis  – northern Tenasserim, Burma, northern and western Thailand, northern Laos, and southern China – Burmese false bloodsucker, small-scaled forest agamid
Pseudocalotes poilani  – southern Laos – Laotian false bloodsucker
Pseudocalotes ziegleri  – Vietnam – Ziegler’s tree lizard

The Sundaland group
Pseudocalotes baliomus  – West Sumatra – spot-shouldered false garden lizard
Pseudocalotes cybelidermus  – southern Sumatra – purple-throated false garden lizard
Pseudocalotes dringi  – peninsular Malaysia – Dring’s false garden lizard
Pseudocalotes drogon  – Fraser’s Hill, Pahang – Drogon’s false garden lizard
Pseudocalotes flavigula  – peninsular Malaysia – Malaya false bloodsucker, yellow-throated forest agamid, yellow-throated false garden lizard
Pseudocalotes guttalineatus  – southern Sumatra – dash-lined false garden lizard
Pseudocalotes larutensis  – peninsular Malaysia – Bukit Larut false garden lizard
Pseudocalotes rhaegal  – Cameron Highlands, Pahang – Rhaegal’s false garden lizard
Pseudocalotes rhammanotus  – southern Sumatra – stitched-back false garden lizard
Pseudocalotes saravacensis  – Sarawak, eastern Malaysia
Pseudocalotes tympanistriga  – lesser tree agama – Java, Indonesia – Indonesian false bloodsucker
Pseudocalotes viserion  – Genting Highlands, Pahang – Viserion’s false garden lizard

Nota bene: A binomial authority in parentheses indicates that the species was originally described in a genus other than Pseudocalotes.

References

 (1843). Systema Reptilium, Fasciculus Primus, Amblyglossae. Vienna: Braumüller & Seidel. 106 pp. + indices. (Pseudocalotes, new genus, p. 46). (in Latin).
,  (2000). "A review of the genus Pseudocalotes (Squamata: Agamidae), with description of a new species from West Malaysia". Amphibia-Reptilia 21: 193–210.
,  (2001). "A  new species of Pseudocalotes from Bukit Larut, West Malaysia". Herpetologica 57 (3): 255–265.
"Three new species of Pseudocalotes (Squamata: Agamidae) from southern Sumatra, Indonesia". Zootaxa 3841 (2): 211–238. (Pseudocalotes cybelidermus, new species; P. guttalineatus, n. sp.; P. rhammanotus, n. sp.).
 (1980). Phylogenetic relationships and historical biogeographical relationships of the genera in the family Agamidae (Reptilia: Lacertilia). PhD dissertation. University of Michigan.
 (1935). The Fauna of British India, including Ceylon and Burma. Reptilia and Amphibia. Vol. II.—Sauria. London: Secretary of State for India in Council. (Taylor and Francis, printers). xiii + 440 pp. + Plate I + 2 maps. (Calotes andamanensis, p. 205; C. floweri, pp. 186–187; C. kakhiensis, pp. 188–189; C. kingdon-wardi, new species, pp. 204–205; C. microlepis, 187-188).
"A new species of the genus Pseudocalotes (Squamata: Agamidae) from peninsular Thailand". The Thailand Natural History Museum Journal 3 (1): 25–31. (June 2008).
 (2010). "A new species of the Genus Pseudocalotes (Squamata: Agamidae) from Vietnam". Russian Journal of Herpetology 17 (1): 31–40. Full article.
 (2010). "Systematic and taxonomic revaluation of four little known Asian agamid species, Calotes kingdonwardi Smith, 1935, Japalura kaulbacki Smith, 1937, Salea kakhienensis Anderson, 1879 and the monotypic genus Mictopholis Smith, 1935 (Reptilia: Agamidae)". Zootaxa 2514: 1–23. Preview
,  (2013). "Rediscovery of Calotes andamanensis Boulenger, 1891, and assessment of its generic allocation". Herpetozoa 26 (1/2): 3-13.
Pseudocalotes. The Reptile Database. www.reptile-database.org.

Pseudocalotes
Lizard genera
Taxa named by Leopold Fitzinger